Yusefabad-e Salar (also Romanized as Yūsefābād-e Sālār; also known as Yūsefābād and Yūsefābād-e Bālā) is a village in Borj-e Akram Rural District, in the Central District of Fahraj County, Kerman Province, Iran. At the 2006 census, its population was 78, in 20 families.

References 

Populated places in Fahraj County